Jaubari  is a village development committee in Nawalpur District in the Lumbini Zone of southern Nepal. At the time of the 1991 Nepal census it had a population of 3076 people living in 455 individual households.

References

Populated places in Nawalpur District